Conotrochus is a genus of small corals in the family Caryophylliidae. It holds four species.

Species
The World Register of Marine Species includes the following species in the genus:

Conotrochus asymmetros Cairns, 1999
Conotrochus brunneus (Moseley, 1881)
Conotrochus funicolumna (Alcock, 1902)
Conotrochus typus † Seguenza, 1863

References

Caryophylliidae
Scleractinia genera